South Church Manse is a historic church parsonage at 138 W. Church Street in Bergenfield, Bergen County, New Jersey, United States.

It was built in 1861 and added to the National Register of Historic Places in 1979.

See also 
 National Register of Historic Places listings in Bergen County, New Jersey

References

External links

Bergenfield, New Jersey
Houses on the National Register of Historic Places in New Jersey
Houses completed in 1861
Houses in Bergen County, New Jersey
National Register of Historic Places in Bergen County, New Jersey
New Jersey Register of Historic Places
Clergy houses in the United States
1861 establishments in New Jersey